"Over the Rainbow" is a ballad by Harold Arlen with lyrics by Yip Harburg. It was written for the 1939 film The Wizard of Oz, in which it was sung by actress Judy Garland in her starring role as Dorothy Gale. It won the Academy Award for Best Original Song and became Garland's signature song.

About five minutes into the film, Dorothy sings the song after failing to get Aunt Em, Uncle Henry, and the farmhands to listen to her story of an unpleasant incident involving her dog, Toto, and the town spinster, Miss Gulch (Margaret Hamilton). Aunt Em tells her to "find yourself a place where you won't get into any trouble". This prompts her to walk off by herself, musing to Toto, "Someplace where there isn't any trouble. Do you suppose there is such a place, Toto? There must be. It's not a place you can get to by a boat, or a train. It's far, far away. Behind the moon, beyond the rain", at which point she begins singing.

Background
Composer Harold Arlen and lyricist Yip Harburg often worked in tandem, Harburg generally suggesting an idea or title for Arlen to set to music, before Harburg contributed the lyrics. For their work together on The Wizard of Oz, Harburg claimed his inspiration was "a ballad for a little girl who... was in trouble and... wanted to get away from... Kansas. A dry, arid, colorless place. She had never seen anything colorful in her life except the rainbow". Arlen decided the idea needed "a melody with a long broad line".

By the time all the other songs for the film had been written, Arlen was feeling the pressure of not having the song for the Kansas scene. He often carried blank pieces of music manuscript in his pockets to jot down short melodic ideas. Arlen described how the inspiration for the melody to "Over the Rainbow" came to him suddenly while his wife Anya drove:

"I said to Mrs. Arlen... 'let's go to Grauman's Chinese ... You drive the car, I don't feel too well right now.' I wasn't thinking of work. I wasn't consciously thinking of work, I just wanted to relax. And as we drove by Schwab's Drug Store on Sunset I said, 'Pull over, please.' ... And we stopped and I really don't know why—bless the muses—and I took out my little bit of manuscript and put down what you know now as 'Over the Rainbow.'"

The song was originally sung in A-flat major. Arlen later wrote the contrasting bridge section based on the idea of "a child's piano exercise".

Italian newspaper Il Messaggero has noted a resemblance, both harmonic and melodic, between Over the Rainbow and the theme of the intermezzo (known as Ratcliff's Dream) of Pietro Mascagni's 1895 opera Guglielmo Ratcliff.

The Wizard of Oz
The music was played on a particularly renowned Stradivarius violin.

Recordings by Judy Garland

On October 7, 1938, Judy Garland recorded the song on the MGM soundstage with an arrangement by Murray Cutter. In September 1939, a studio recording of the song, not from the film soundtrack, was recorded and released as a single for Decca. In March 1940, that same recording was included on a Decca 78 four-record studio cast album entitled The Wizard of Oz. Although this isn't the version that appeared in the film, Decca continued to release the "cast album" into the 1960s after it was reissued on disc, a 33-rpm album.

The film version of "Over the Rainbow" was unavailable to the public until the soundtrack was released by MGM in 1956 to coincide with the television premiere of The Wizard of Oz. The soundtrack version has been re-released several times over the years, including a deluxe edition by Rhino in 1995.

After The Wizard of Oz appeared in 1939, "Over the Rainbow" became Garland's signature song. She performed it for thirty years and sang it as she had for the film. She said she wanted to remain true to the character of Dorothy and to the message of being somewhere over the rainbow.

Other lyrics
An introductory verse ("When all the world is a hopeless jumble...") that was omitted from the film is sometimes used in theatrical productions of The Wizard of Oz and is included in the piano sheet music from the film. It was used in versions by Tony Bennett, Al Bowlly, Doris Day, Ella Fitzgerald, Frank Sinatra, Sarah Vaughan, Mandy Patinkin, Trisha Yearwood, Melissa Manchester, Hilary Kole, Jewel, and Norma Waterson. Judy Garland sang the introductory verse at least once, on a 1948 radio broadcast of The Louella Parsons Show. Lyrics for a second verse ("Once by a word only lightly spoken...") appeared in the British edition of the sheet music.

Awards and honors
In March 2017, "Over the Rainbow" sung by Judy Garland was entered in the National Recording Registry by the Library of Congress as music that is "culturally, historically, or artistically significant". The Recording Industry Association of America (RIAA) and the National Endowment for the Arts (NEA) ranked it number one on their Songs of the Century list. The American Film Institute named it best movie song on the AFI's 100 Years...100 Songs list.

"Over the Rainbow" was given the Towering Song Award by the Songwriters Hall of Fame and was sung at its dinner on June 12, 2014, by Jackie Evancho. In April 2005, the United States Postal Service issued a commemorative stamp honoring Yip Harburg that includes a lyric.

It was sent as an audio wakeup call to astronauts aboard the STS-88 space shuttle mission on Flight Day 4, dedicated to astronaut Robert D. Cabana by his daughter Sara.

According to his family, Gene Wilder died while listening to "Over the Rainbow" sung by Ella Fitzgerald, one of his favorite songs.

German versions
The first German version in the English language was recorded by the Swing Orchestra Heinz Wehner (1908–1945) in March 1940 in Berlin. Wehner, at this time a well-known international German swing artist, also took over the vocals. The first German version in German language was sung by Inge Brandenburg (1929–1999) in 1960.

Israel Kamakawiwoʻole version

On the album  Facing Future (1993), Israel Kamakawiwoʻole included "Over the Rainbow" in a ukulele medley with "What a Wonderful World" by Louis Armstrong. Kamakawiwoʻole called the recording studio at 3a.m. He was given 15 minutes to arrive by Milan Bertosa. Bertosa said, "And in walks the largest human being I had seen in my life. Israel was probably like 500 pounds. And the first thing at hand is to find something for him to sit on." A security guard gave Israel a large steel chair. "Then I put up some microphones, do a quick sound check, roll tape, and the first thing he does is 'Somewhere Over the Rainbow.' He played and sang, one take, and it was over."

Chart activity and sales
Kamakawiwoʻole's version reached number 12 on the Billboard Hot Digital Tracks chart during the week of January 31, 2004 (for the survey week ending January 18, 2004). In the U.S., it was certified Platinum for 1,000,000 downloads sold. As of October 2014 it had sold over 4.2 million digital copies.

In the UK his version was released as a single under the title "Somewhere Over the Rainbow". It entered the UK Official Singles Chart in April 2007 at number 68. In Germany, the single also returned to the German Singles Chart in September 2010. After two weeks on that chart, it received gold status for selling 150,000 copies. In October 2010, it reached number one on the German charts. In 2011 was certified 5× gold for selling over 750,000 copies. It stayed at the top spot for twelve non-consecutive weeks and was the most successful single in Germany in 2010. In March 2010 it was the second best-selling download in Germany with digital sales between 500,000 and 600,000. In France, it debuted at number four in December 2010 and reached number one. In Switzerland, it received Platinum status for 30,000 copies sold.

Kamakawiwoʻole's version of "Over the Rainbow" has been used in commercials, films and television programs, including 50 First Dates, Charmed, Cold Case, ER, Finding Forrester, Horizon, Life on Mars, Meet Joe Black, Scrubs, Snakes on a Plane, Son of the Mask, and the television series South Pacific. The Kamakawiwoʻole version was sung by the cast of Glee on the season one finale "Journey" and included on Glee: The Music, Journey to Regionals, charting at number 30 in the UK, 31 in Canada and Ireland, 42 in Australia, and 43 in the U.S.

Eva Cassidy version

Eva Cassidy recorded a version of the song for The Other Side (1992). After her death in 1996, it was included on the posthumous compilation Songbird (1998). In December 2000, a clip of Cassidy performing the song was featured on the BBC2 program Top of the Pops 2. Following the premiere, it became the program's most-requested video in history, and demand for the album soared after the clip was re-aired in January 2001. The song was subsequently released as a single the same month, on January 29.

"Over the Rainbow" debuted at number 88 on the UK Singles Chart in February 2001 and climbed to number 42 in May, becoming Cassidy's first single to chart in the United Kingdom. In Scotland, it reached number 36, giving Cassidy her first top-40 single in that region. It was her highest-charting song in the United Kingdom until 2007, when "What a Wonderful World" reached number one. The song also reached number 27 in Ireland in December, becoming her only top-40 hit in that country.

Cassidy's recording was selected by the BBC for its Songs of the Century album in 1999. Her performance at Blues Alley appeared on the album Simply Eva (2011).

Track listing
UK CD single
 "Over the Rainbow" – 4:58
 "Dark End of the Street" – 3:52

Charts

Certifications

Cliff Richard version

On 3 December 2001, the British singer Cliff Richard recorded a cover of the mashup "Somewhere Over the Rainbow"/"What a Wonderful World" on his album Wanted. At the time of release the official website for the album explained that it consisted of "hits Cliff's always 'Wanted' to record." The album is primarily made up of cover songs, including songs by artists such as Elvis Presley, The Beatles, Carole King and Tina Turner. The inspiration for the album came when Richard was sent a copy of Israel Kamakawiwo'ole's recording of "Over the Rainbow" combined with "What a Wonderful World" weeks into the year 2000 and he knew immediately he wanted to record it.

The mashup reggae-themed track with a lot of similarities to the Israel Kamakawiwo'ole arrangement was released as the debut single from the album Wanted and charted on the UK Singles Chart peaking at number 11 and stayed for 6 weeks in the British charts. Richard premiered it on the Open House with Gloria Hunniford on 6 November 2001. On the date of release of the single on 3 December 2001, he was invited to the ITV programme This Morning to perform it live. He also performed it at the Premier Christmas Spectacular at Methodist Westminster Central Hall in London on 14 December 2001.

Charts

Danielle Hope version

Danielle Hope, the winner of the BBC talent show Over the Rainbow, released a cover version of the song as a digital download on May 23, 2010, and a single on May 31, 2010. As it was recorded before a winner was announced, runners-up Lauren Samuels and Sophie Evans also recorded versions.

The single was a charity record that raised money for the BBC Performing Arts Fund and Prostate UK.

Track listings
UK digital download
"Over the Rainbow" – 2:58

CD single
"Over the Rainbow"
"The Wizard of Oz medley" – Sophie Evans, Danielle Hope and Lauren Samuels

Charts

Ariana Grande version

American singer Ariana Grande released a version of the song on June 6, 2017, to raise money at her benefit concert One Love Manchester after 22 people were killed in the Manchester Arena bombing at Grande's concert on May 22, 2017.

Live performances
Grande sang the single for the first time on TV at the One Love Manchester benefit concert on June 4, 2017. It was then added to the setlist of the Dangerous Woman Tour.

Track listing

Charts

Release history

Robin Schulz, Alle Farben and Israel Kamakawiwoʻole version

In July 2021, German musician, DJ and record producer Robin Schulz and the German DJ and producer Alle Farben released a mashup "Somewhere Over the Rainbow / What a Wonderful World" based on Kamakawiwoʻole's version and voice on Sony Music Entertainment, B1/Warner Music. The new remix version has charted in Germany, France and Belgium. A new official video was also released.

Charts

Other versions

The Demensions recorded an ethereal, orchestral and dreamy doo-wop version, arranged by composer Seymour Barab that reached number 16 on the Billboard Hot 100 in 1960.
 Katharine McPhee's version in 2006 reached number 12 on the Billboard Hot 100.
 Nicholas David, a contestant on the third season of The Voice, recorded a version that went to number 96 on the Billboard Hot 100 in 2012 with sales of 48,000 copies.

See also
 Musical selections in The Wizard of Oz
 List of 1930s jazz standards
 List of best-selling singles
 List of best-selling singles in the United States

References

External links
 The Judy Garland Online Discography

1939 songs
1939 singles
1930s jazz standards
Songs about weather
Film theme songs
Best Original Song Academy Award-winning songs
American songs
Pop ballads
Songs written for films
Songs with music by Harold Arlen
Songs with lyrics by Yip Harburg
Songs from The Wizard of Oz (1939 film)
Judy Garland songs
Labelle songs
Somewhere Over the Rainbow
Al Bowlly songs
Ben Platt songs
Grammy Hall of Fame Award recipients
United States National Recording Registry recordings
Pop standards
Grammy Award for Best Instrumental Arrangement Accompanying Vocalist(s)
Polydor Records singles
Republic Records singles
Sony Music singles
Warner Music Group singles